The 1934 United States Senate election in Nebraska took place on November 6, 1934. A special election was held on the same day for the same seat. The incumbent Senator, Republican Robert B. Howell, died on March 11, 1933. William Henry Thompson, a Democratic politician, was appointed to the vacant seat. Richard C. Hunter was elected to finish Howell's term, while Burke was elected to the next term, defeating Robert G. Simmons. This was the last time until 1976 that a Democrat won a Senate election in Nebraska.

Democratic primary

Candidates
Charles W. Bryan, Governor of Nebraska
Edward R. Burke, Representative for Nebraska's 2nd district
Willis E. Reed, independent candidate in 1926 for Nebraska's 3rd district

Results

Republican primary

Candidates
Robert G. Simmons, former Representative for Nebraska's 6th district
Kenneth S. Wherry, former State Senator for the 16th district

Results

Results

References 

1934
Nebraska
United States Senate